Carlos Varela González (born November 26, 1966, in Camagüey) is retired male wrestler from Cuba. He represented his native country at the 1996 Summer Olympics in Atlanta, Georgia, and twice won a gold medal at the Pan American Games during his career.

References
 

1966 births
Living people
Wrestlers at the 1996 Summer Olympics
Cuban male sport wrestlers
Olympic wrestlers of Cuba
Sportspeople from Camagüey
Pan American Games gold medalists for Cuba
Pan American Games silver medalists for Cuba
Pan American Games medalists in wrestling
Wrestlers at the 1987 Pan American Games
Wrestlers at the 1991 Pan American Games
Wrestlers at the 1995 Pan American Games
Medalists at the 1987 Pan American Games
Medalists at the 1991 Pan American Games
Medalists at the 1995 Pan American Games
20th-century Cuban people
21st-century Cuban people